Cripple Creek is a river in southern Herkimer County and northern Otsego County in the state of New York. It begins northeast of Warren and flows through Weaver Lake then Young Lake before flowing into Otsego Lake south of Springfield Center. Was formally referred to as Lawyers Creek.

Course
Cripple Creek flows through Clarke Pond before discharging into Otsego Lake.

References

Rivers of Otsego County, New York
Rivers of Herkimer County, New York
Rivers of New York (state)